Albert Auguste Toussaint Brachet (1 January 1869 – 27 December 1930) was a Belgian physician and professor of anatomy and embryology at the University of Bruxelles. Brachet was a founder of the field of "causal embryology", the study of embryology and development using experiments.

Brachet was born in  Liège of French ancestry. He studied medicine in Liège where he took an interest in embryology under Edouard van Beneden. He worked for a while as histology preparator for Auguste Swaen. He received his doctor of medicine in 1894 followed by some studies at Edinburgh University under Sir William Turner and then in Germany under Ernst Gaupp and Gustav Jacob Born. He returned to Liège  and became an assistant in anatomy in 1895. He studied cranial development in the amphibians and reptiles. In 1904 he became Chair of Anatomy and Embryology at Bruxelles where he worked until his death. His son Jean Brachet became a physiologist and biochemist.

Brachet moved from the descriptive embryology of his period to experimental approaches which involved experiments such as the removal of specific cells in the embryo to observe the alteration in development. He gave the approach the name of "causal embryology." Brachet served as Rector of the University of Brussels from 1923 to 1926. His students included Pol Gerard, Maurice Herlant and Albert Dalcq.

References 

1869 births
1930 deaths
Embryologists
Physicians from Liège
Scientists from Liège